Abílio Neves dos Reis (born 25 March 1975), commonly known as Abílio, is a Brazilian retired footballer who played for Partizani Tirana and Vllaznia Shkodër Albanian Superliga as well as Dajti in the Albanian First Division.

References

1975 births
Living people
Association football midfielders
Brazilian footballers
Brazilian expatriate footballers
Brazilian expatriate sportspeople in Albania
Expatriate footballers in Albania
Kategoria e Parë players
Kategoria Superiore players
FK Partizani Tirana players
KF Vllaznia Shkodër players
Diagoras F.C. players
FC Kamza players
Mixto Esporte Clube players
Operário Futebol Clube (Várzea Grande) players
Footballers from Brasília